The golden-browed chat-tyrant (Silvicultrix pulchella) is a species of passerine bird in the family Tyrannidae. It is found in the Yungas of Peru and Bolivia.

Its natural habitat is subtropical or tropical moist montane forests.

References

golden-browed chat-tyrant
Birds of the Yungas
golden-browed chat-tyrant
golden-browed chat-tyrant
golden-browed chat-tyrant
Taxonomy articles created by Polbot